Helmipuuro (Finnish) is a type of porridge traditional in Finland. The porridge is made from monodisperse grains of potato starch that are swelled in boiling milk into translucent "pearls" of about 5 mm in diameter, thus the name helmipuuro ("pearl porridge"). As with other porridges, it can be eaten as is or flavored with butter, kissel, berries, jam or sugar.

It is grain- and gluten-free and thus suitable for sufferers of the coeliac disease.

See also 
 List of porridges
 Tapioca pudding
 

Finnish cuisine
Porridges
Puddings